Association for Automatic Identification and Mobility is an industry trade group that developed and standardized bar codes, Automatic identification and data capture.  It is based in Cranberry Township, Butler County, Pennsylvania.

References

Butler County, Pennsylvania
Barcodes
Automatic identification and data capture